Lakshman Singh Charak was a nominated Member of Parliament of the 1st Lok Sabha of India.

References 

India MPs 1952–1957
1912 births
Year of death missing
Jammu & Kashmir National Conference politicians